Steeve Briois (born 28 November 1972) is a French politician. In 2017, he was interim leader of the National Front. In 2014, he was elected mayor of Hénin-Beaumont and a member of the European Parliament. From 2011 to 2014, he was general-secretary of the Front National. He was a member of the regional council of Nord-Pas-de-Calais from 1998 to 2014.

He was the interim leader of the National Front from 28 April 2017, after the previous interim leader, Jean-François Jalkh, stepped down.

Early life 
Briois was born in Seclin, Nord, where his father was a worker and his mother a bookkeeper. His parents later divorced. Fascinated by Jean-Marie Le Pen, he became a member of Front National at the age of 16. After finishing a Brevet de Technicien Supérieur, Briois worked for a period as a salesman for Numericable.

Political career 

In 1995, Briois became a member of the municipal council in Hénin-Beaumont and, in 1998, a member of the regional council of Nord-Pas-de-Calais. When Bruno Mégret broke from Front National in 1998, Briois followed him, but returned in 2000.

In the 2008 French municipal elections, Briois ran for mayor in Hénin-Beaumont on a list which had Marine Le Pen in second spot. Receiving 28.83% of the votes, the bid failed in its first round, with the list getting 5 of the 35 seats in the municipal council.

The elected mayor, Gérard Dalongeville, resigned from his post in 2009 following allegations of economic irregularities, resulting in a by-election. The list of Briois obtained 39.34% of the votes in the first round of that election, but lost in the second round with 47.62% of the votes to a miscellaneous left list which obtained 52.38%.

Briois was elected a member of the central committee of National Front in 2007. After Marine Le Pen became president of the party in 2011, he was named general secretary of the party.

In the 2014 French municipal elections, Briois was elected mayor of Hénin-Beaumont in the first round in March with 50.26% of the votes. He was elected a member of the European Parliament for North-West France in the European Parliament elections in May the same year. Briois was placed second on a list led by Marine Le Pen, which obtained five seats.

At the Front National Congress in Lyon in November 2014, Briois was elected one of the vice-presidents of the party, responsible for local executives and supervision, and was succeeded by Nicolas Bay as general-secretary.

2013 book and privacy case 
In the book Le Front National des villes et le Front National des champs, published in 2013, the author Octave Nitkowski wrote that Briois was gay. Briois, who neither denied nor confirmed the information, demanded along with another politician that the book be stopped for violation of privacy. A local court ruled that the book be stopped for this reason, but the Court of Appeal of Paris overturned the decision with regard to Briois, stating that for leading politicians, the public's right for information carried more weight than the politician's right to privacy.

Briois has subsequently revealed himself to be in a relationship with fellow National Rally politician Bruno Bilde.

Awards 
In January 2015, Briois received the Le Trombinoscope prize for local politicians of the year. The prize winner is selected by French journalists, and Briois was selected as a symbol of Front National's success in the 2014 elections. It was the first Trombinoscope prize awarded to a politician for the Front National. The award ceremony was held in the office of the President of the National Assembly, but President Claude Bartolone did not attend in protest at the prize being awarded to Briois. The French prime minister, Manuel Valls, the Minister of Ecology, Ségolène Royal, and the Minister of Economy, Emmanuel Macron, who had also won awards, did not attend either, but sent representatives to the ceremony.

Electoral performance 
Briois has contested numerous elections under the FN banner:

Municipal elections

Regional elections

European Parliament elections

References

External links 
 Steeve Briois at the European Parliament
 Steeve Briois  at Front National website
 Blog  of Steeve Briois

1972 births
Living people
People from Seclin
Mayors of places in Hauts-de-France
National Rally (France) politicians
MEPs for North-West France 2014–2019
National Rally (France) MEPs
Articles containing video clips
LGBT mayors of places in France
Gay politicians
LGBT conservatism
LGBT MEPs for France